George Peabody is a bronze statue of George Peabody (1795–1869), by William Wetmore Story. The bronze, cast in Rome by Alessandro Nelli's foundry, is located at the East garden of Mount Vernon Place, Baltimore.

It was dedicated on April 7, 1890.

Inscriptions
The inscriptions read:

(Sculpture, bronze base, back proper right side of figure:) 
 

(Plinth, bronze plaque on back:) 

A signed Founder's mark appears.

London statue
 The statue is a replica of one next to the Royal Exchange in the City of London, executed between 1867 and 1869, and unveiled in July 1869 shortly before Peabody's death.

See also
List of public art in Baltimore
Fort McHenry

References

Further reading
: discusses the full circumstances of the commissioning, erection and reception of the original London statue.

Landmarks in Baltimore
Monuments and memorials in Maryland
Tourist attractions in Baltimore
1869 sculptures
Bronze sculptures in Maryland
Mount Vernon, Baltimore
Statues in Maryland
Sculptures of men in Maryland
1869 establishments in Maryland
Outdoor sculptures in Baltimore